Benjamin "Ben" Wattman is an American former soccer player who earned two caps, scoring one goal, with the U.S. national team in 1949. Wattman earned his first caps in a 6–0 loss to Mexico on September 4, 1949.  Fourteen days later, he earned his second cap and scored a goal in a 6–2 loss to Mexico.  Both of these games were part of the 1949 NAFC Championship which was used as the regional qualification tournament for the 1950 FIFA World Cup.  Despite the two losses to Mexico, the U.S. qualified for the World Cup with a tie and win over Cuba.  Wattman was not selected for the World Cup roster.  At the time, he played for New York Hakoah in the American Soccer League.

References

American soccer players
American Soccer League (1933–1983) players
New York Hakoah players
United States men's international soccer players
Year of birth missing (living people)
Living people
Association footballers not categorized by position